Sergei Aleksandrovich Nemolodyshev (born  March 30, 1985) is a Russian professional ice hockey winger who currently plays for Avtomobilist Yekaterinburg of the Kontinental Hockey League (KHL).

References

External links
 

1985 births
Living people
Avtomobilist Yekaterinburg players
Russian ice hockey left wingers